Stephen Boyle (born 1953) is an Australian footballer.

Stephen Boyle may also refer to:

Sir Stephen Gurney Boyle, 5th Baronet (born 1962) of the Boyle baronets
Steve Boyle (rugby union) (born 1953), British rugby player
Steve Boyle (boxer) (born 1962), British lightweight boxer

See also
Boyle (disambiguation)